This is a list of bog bodies in order of country in which they were first discovered. Bog bodies, or bog people, are the naturally preserved corpses of humans and some animals recovered from peat bogs. The bodies have been most commonly found in the Northern European countries of Denmark, Germany, The Netherlands, the United Kingdom and Ireland. Reports of bog bodies surfaced during the early 18th century.

In 1965, the German scientist Alfred Dieck catalogued more than 1,850 bog bodies, but later scholarship revealed much of Dieck's work was erroneous. Hundreds of bog bodies have been recovered and studied, although it is believed that only around 45 bog bodies remain intact today.

How to use this list 
 There may be more than one name in the "name" category, which may also be used to show alternate spellings for names of the bog body.
 The location category shows the city or state in which the bog body was discovered, although some bog bodies are discovered on borders between countries.
 The carbon-14 dating is used to determine an age range based on examination of the half lives of carbon isotopes.
 The "sex" category describes whether the find was male, female or undetermined.
 The "description" category depicts examination details as well as physical characteristics of the body. Some sections may state Little is published about this find, meaning that there is little or no sufficient information published about the bog body.

List

Denmark

Germany

Ireland

Netherlands

Poland

Sweden

Great Britain

Other locations

See also 
 Egtved Girl, a barrow body in a coffin preserved by a bog

References

External links 

 Archaeology Magazine- Bodies of the bog
 Mummytombs.com – Bog bodies
 Journal of Archaeological Science – Dating bog bodies by means of 14C-AMS

Bog bodies